1000 Smiling Knuckles is the fourth studio album by American grunge band Skin Yard. The cover art is by Jim Blanchard. The first single was the title track, for which a video was shot.

Critical reception

The Chicago Tribune noted that "the band's rhythm section is better-recorded and Ben McMillan is actually trying to sing melody lines instead of just shouting over the din."

Track listing

Personnel
 Jack Endino – guitar, producer, engineering
 Daniel House – bass, art direction
 Barrett Martin – drums
 Ben McMillan – vocals
 Jim Blanchard – artwork

References

External links
Information about 1000 Smiling Knuckles on band page
Information about 1000 Smiling Knuckles on Endino page

Skin Yard albums
1991 albums
Albums produced by Jack Endino
Cruz Records albums